Federal Route 11 or Bahau-Keratong Highway, is a federal highway in Malaysia which links Serting to Bandar Tun Abdul Razak. The  roads passes through Kampung Tengah, Tasik Bera, and Kota Shahbandar and crosses the state border between the Negeri Sembilan and Pahang.

The Kilometre Zero is located at Serting in Negeri Sembilan.

At most sections, the Federal Route 11 was built under the JKR R5 road standard, allowing maximum speed limit of up to 90 km/h.

List of junctions

References

011
Highways in Malaysia